The First Battle of Lyman was a military engagement during the 2022 Russian invasion of Ukraine, as part of the battle of Donbas of the wider eastern Ukraine offensive. It began on 23 May and ended on 27 May 2022.

Background 
A month into the Russian invasion, Russia claimed to control 93% of Luhansk Oblast, leaving Sievierodonetsk and Lysychansk as strategically important Ukrainian holdouts in the area. Russian plans to capture Sievierodonetsk hinged upon its successes in the nearby cities of Rubizhne to the north and Popasna to the south. By 6 April, Russian forces had reportedly captured 60% of Rubizhne, and shells and rockets were landing in Sievierodonetsk on "regular, sustained intervals". The next day, forces of the 128th Mountain Assault Brigade conducted an offensive which reportedly drove Russian forces 6–10 kilometers away from the other nearby town of Kreminna. Russian forces reportedly seized Rubizhne and the nearby town of Voevodivka on 12 May 2022.

South of Lyman, the battle of the Siverskyi Donets occurred mid-May 2022, with Ukraine repelling multiple Russian attempts to cross the river. Russian forces suffered an estimated 400 to 485 dead and wounded during the attempts.

Battle 
Russian forces intensified offensive operations around Lyman and made gains on 23 May. Russian forces launched an assault on the northern part of Lyman and took at least partial control of the city. Russian forces additionally intensified artillery strikes against Avdiivka and took advantage of their previous capture of Novoselivka to advance on Avdiivka and gain highway access toward Slovyansk. The Russians intensified its attacks towards the city center the next day, starting street fights. With the support of artillery and aviation, on 25 May, Russian forces continued the offensive towards the settlement of Lyman, capturing about 70% of the city's territory. Ukrainian forces withdrew to the southern settlements of the city, offering fierce resistance, while some soldiers surrendered during the siege.

After conducting a final evacuation of civilians and leaving supplies for those who decided to stay, the last Ukrainian forces evacuated Lyman on the afternoon of 26 May, destroying the last remaining bridge behind them. Ukrainian presidential advisor Oleksiy Arestovych said that the city had been captured by Russian forces, a statement confirmed by the Institute for the Study of War.

The next day, however, Ukrainian Defence Ministry claimed that the battle for control of the city was still ongoing, stating their forces were continuing to hold the southwestern and northeastern districts, while other Ukrainian officials acknowledged most of Lyman, including the city center, was under Russian control. In addition, the United Kingdom also assessed most of the town had come under Russian control by 27 May. Both Russian-backed separatist forces and the Russian military made separate claims of victory on 27 and 28 May. Early on 30 May, the Ukrainian military acknowledged Russian forces had consolidated in Lyman and were preparing for an attack towards Sloviansk.

It was reported that during the fighting, a battalion of Ukraine's 79th Air Assault Brigade suffered more than 100 killed, while between 200 and 300 soldiers were captured.

Aftermath

Russia gained a strategic railroad hub, and indirectly sped up the Battle of Sievierodonetsk, and pushed Ukrainian forces to the right bank of Siverskyi Donets river until early September.

The second battle started on 10 September during Ukraine's counteroffensive. By 30 September Ukrainian forces had closed in on the city and cut off the only road left supplying the occupying forces.

See also 
 Outline of the Russo-Ukrainian War

References

May 2022 events in Ukraine
Battles of the 2022 Russian invasion of Ukraine
Battles of the war in Donbas
Battles involving the Donetsk People's Republic
Eastern Ukraine offensive
Battle